Yaowarat Road in Samphanthawong District is the main artery of Bangkok's Chinatown. Modern Chinatown now covers a large area around Yaowarat and Charoen Krung Road. It has been the main centre for trading by the Chinese community since they moved from their old site some 200 years ago to make way for the construction of Wat Phra Kaew, the Grand Palace. Nearby is the Phahurat or Little India. The area is bordered by the Chao Phraya River to the south. Yaowarat Road is well known for its variety of foodstuffs, and at night turns into a large "food street" that draws tourists and locals from all over the city.

History 
Chinatown is in one of the oldest areas of Bangkok. It is the result of the resettlement of Chinese on the west bank of Chao Phraya River after King Rama I moved the capital of the kingdom from Thonburi to Rattanakosin. From there Chinese traders operated maritime junk trade between (Siam) and China throughout the Rattanakosin period. By the end of 1891, King Rama V had ordered the construction of many roads, including Yaowarat Road. Chinatown does not consist of only Yaowarat Road, but also includes others such as Charoen Krung Road, Mangkon Road, Songwat Road, Songsawat Road, Ratchawong Road, and Chakkrawat Road. Yaowarat's Sampheng Market is the center of the area. The path of the road is said to resemble a dragon's curvy body, making it an auspicious location for business. Since it was built to avoid the existing cluster of houses of the people according the king's policy. Yaowarat is a road with a length of about 1.5 km (0.93 mi), 20 m (65 ft) wide and takes 8 years to build (1892–1900). There are many shops selling gold, garments, textiles, stationery, souvenirs, second-hand parts and equipment, electric goods, computer parts, antiques, imported musical instruments and local delicacies. Based on 2002 data, there are 132 gold shops (including nearby), which is considered the area with the most gold shops in the world. Therefore, it was dubbed as "Golden Road" in tandem "Dragon Road".

Land prices around Yaowarat Road have always been among the most expensive in Bangkok and Thailand due to limited land which is mostly owned by prominent Thai-Chinese families.

This road was originally named "Yuppharat Road" and later changed to "Yaowarat Road", which means "young king", in honour to Prince Vajirunhis, the first crown prince of Thailand, who was the first son of King Rama V. Before it was a road it was just rice fields and canals. In 1894, an electric tram car service passed through Charoen Krung and Yaowarat Roads, this service only ceased in 1968. Prior World War II, regarded as the busiest area in Bangkok, it was the first road where the country's tallest buildings where situated, called seven-storeyed and nine-storeyed buildings on both sides of the road. There were many famous Chinese restaurants, Chaloem Buri Cinema the most modern one in that decade, many reliable gold shops as well as hundred of shops selling  both fresh and preserved merchandised used for Chinese food cooking. At present, Yaowarat's significance is not fading. It is still one of the country's most busting commercial and delicious food district.

On 3 June 1946, King Rama VIII and his younger brother, Prince Bhumibol (later King Rama IX), visited Yaowarat and Sampheng by walking from morning until noon. This event is considered a milestone of Yaowarat and causing conflicts between Thais and Thais of Chinese descent, including overseas Chinese who live in Thailand to end.

Nowadays, every Chinese New Year festival Yaowarat Road will become a venue for great celebrations. The road will be closed to completely turn into a pedestrian street. Princess Maha Chakri Sirindhorn has always presided over the opening ceremony, and since December 15, 2019 on every Sunday, this road from 07:00 p.m.-12:00 a.m. will be completely closed to become a pedestrian street (only section Chaloem Buri to Ratchawong Intersections).

Characteristics
Yaowarat is a road with a total length of 1,532 m (about 5,026 ft) with traffic management as one-way running in opposite directions to the parallel, Charoen Krung Road. Starting from the Odeon Circle near Wat Traimit, or Temple of Golden Buddha, and spans canal Khlong Ong Ang to end at Wang Burapha Intersection in front of Wang Burapha area in Phra Nakhon District.

Transportation
Yaowarat Road is served by the BMTA and affiliated's bus lines: 1, 4, 7 (only section Ratchawong to Chakkrawat Roads) 21, 25, 40, 53, 73, 73ก, 507, 529, 542, and there are four bus stops: Thian Fah Foundation Hospital, Chaloem Buri, Talat Kao (Old Market) and Wat Tuek.

The road also served by the Wat Mangkon Station of the MRT Subway, whose Blue Line runs under the nearby Charoen Krung Road.

References

External links

 

Chinese-Thai culture
Neighbourhoods of Bangkok
Samphanthawong district
Shopping districts and streets in Thailand
Streets in Bangkok